Gladstone is an unincorporated community located within Peapack-Gladstone in Somerset County, New Jersey, United States. The area is served as United States Postal Service ZIP Code 07934.

As of the 2010 United States Census, the population for ZIP Code Tabulation Area 07934 was 1,501.

Transportation
Gladstone is an NJ Transit station that is the western terminus of the Gladstone Branch of the Morris and Essex line. Out of 23 inbound and 26 outbound daily weekday trains, 2 inbound and 2 outbound trains (about 8%) use the Kearny Connection to Secaucus Junction and New York Penn Station in Midtown Manhattan; the rest go to Hoboken Terminal. Passengers can transfer at Newark Broad Street or Summit stations to reach the other destination if necessary.

Notable people

People who were born in, residents of, or otherwise closely associated with Gladstone include:
 Charles E. Apgar (1865–1950), business executive and amateur radio operator best known for making early recordings of coded German radio transmissions at the start of World War I.
 Jason Gore (born 1974), PGA Tour professional golfer who is the Senior Director of Player Relations for the United States Golf Association.
 Orin R. Smith, former chairman and CEO of Engelhard Corporation

References

Peapack-Gladstone, New Jersey
Unincorporated communities in Somerset County, New Jersey
Unincorporated communities in New Jersey